Two types of credits are traditionally used in films, television programs, and video games, all of which provide attribution to the staff involved in their productions. While opening credits will usually display only the major positions in a production's cast and crew (such as creators, producers, and lead actors), closing credits will typically acknowledge all staff members that were involved in the production.

Opening credits

Opening credits, in a television program, motion picture, or video game, are shown at the beginning of a show or movie after the production logos and list the most important members of the production. They are usually shown as text. Some opening credits are built around animation or production numbers of some sort (such as the James Bond films). Opening credits mention the major actors; the lead actor is prominent, and the supporting actors follow. Others that are listed are guest stars, producers and director, as opposed to closing credits, which list the entire production crew.

Closing credits

Closing credits, in a television program, motion picture, or video game, come at the end of a show and list all the cast and crew involved in the production. Almost all television and film productions, however, omit the names of orchestra members from the closing credits, instead citing the name of the orchestra and sometimes not even that. Also most often omitted are the names of translators involved in subtitling, as well as any technicians involved in the process, even in productions that are made with a view to the international market and therefore premiere with subtitles.

Closing credits are usually shown on the screen in small characters, which either flip very quickly from page to page or scroll from bottom to top of the screen. Credits which scroll either left to right or up and down are also known as staff rolls, which comes from pre-digital days when the names were literally on a roll of paper and would pass in front of the camera. Standard film credits move from bottom to top and are often called "credit crawls." Industry traditions, guild rules, and union rules generally dictate the order and placement of specific names and job titles. Increasingly, post-credits scenes are being added to the end of films. Still, short or full logos appear at the end of films (with the exception of Universal Pictures).

Credits for motion pictures often include the name of any locales (i.e., cities, states, and countries if outside of the US) used to film scenes, as well as any organizations not related to the production (e.g., schools, government entities, military bases, etc.) that played a role in the filming.

Billing

Billing is a film term denoting the amount and order in which film credits information is presented in advertising and on the film itself. Information given in billing usually consists of the actors appearing in the movie, the directors, producers, the companies producing and distributing the movie (by name and/or logo), and artistic and technical crew. The title of the movie is also considered to be part of the billing.

In the layout of film posters and other advertising copy, the billing is usually placed at the bottom of the poster in what is known as the billing block.

WGA screenwriting credit system

In the United States, screenwriting credit for motion pictures and television programs under its jurisdiction is determined by the Writers Guild of America (WGA). The Guild is the final arbiter of who receives credit for writing the screenplay, the original story, or creating the original characters, a privilege it has possessed since 1941. If a production company is a signatory to the Guild's Basic Agreement, it must comply with the Guild's rules.

See also
 Production logo
 Title sequence
 All persons fictitious disclaimer

References

Film and video terminology